Catherine Rich (10 June 1932 – 18 January 2021) was a French actress.

Life 
Rich was born in the 17th arrondissement of Paris in 1932. Her father Renaudin and her maternal grandfather were politicians.

She married Claude Rich who was also an actor.

The 1962 cast of The Burning Court included Rich who was making her debut on the screen.

In 1972 she took a role in the TV miniseries Les Rois maudits. In 1991 she was nominated for a Molière Award for her role in the play La Dame de chez Maxim.

Rich died in the 18th arrondissement of Paris in January 2021.

Private life
She and her husband, Claude Rich, had two daughters and an adopted son. Her husband died in 2017 from cancer.

References

External links 
 

1932 births
2021 deaths
People from Paris
20th-century French actresses
21st-century French actresses